John B. Clopton (February 12, 1789 – March 20, 1860) was a nineteenth-century American politician and jurist from Virginia.

Early life
Clopton was born in Cumberland County, the son of John Clopton. He served in the Virginia militia in the War of 1812. In 1818 Clopton attended the College of William and Mary in Williamsburg, Virginia. He then practiced law in his home county.

Career

Elected as a Virginia state senator for several years, Clopton was also chosen as a delegate to the Virginia Constitutional Convention of 1829-1830. There he was elected by the Convention to serve on the Bill of Rights Committee that considered matters not referred to the Legislative, Executive or Judicial Committees. He was elected from the senatorial district made up of Charles City, Elizabeth City, James City, Henrico, New Kent, Warwick and York Counties, and the cities of Williamsburg and Richmond, and served along with John Marshall, John Tyler, and Philip N. Nicholas of that district.

Clopton was appointed by the Virginia Assembly as judge of the Seventh Judicial Circuit in 1834, then served on the Virginia General Court from 1834 to 1851. From 1851 until his death nine years later, he was appointed as judge of the Sixth Circuit.

He was corresponding secretary of the Virginia Historical Society alongside Hugh Blair Grigsby, who also served in the 1830 Constitutional Convention.

Death
John B. Clopton died on March 20, 1860 at Old Point Comfort Virginia.

References

Bibliography

Virginia state senators
1789 births
1860 deaths
19th-century American politicians